Helge Øvreberg (born 1973) is a Norwegian retired football defender.

From Stryn, he came up in the club Sogndal IL and was drafted into the first team squad in 1992. In the same season he had five Eliteserien matches. He never broke through and increasingly played for the B team.

In 1997, he played for Ny-Krohnborg IL, and from 1998 IL Nest-Sotra. In 2000 and 2001, he played for the Bergen-based club IL Frøya. In 2003 he made his senior debut for childhood club Stryn TIL.

Øvreberg was the best man for Tore André Flo.

References

1973 births
Living people
People from Stryn
Norwegian footballers
Sogndal Fotball players
Nest-Sotra Fotball players
Eliteserien players
Norwegian First Division players
Association football defenders
Sportspeople from Vestland